GemCraft is a series of tower defense games created by Hungarian studio Game In A Bottle, in which magical gems are used as the primary means of offense and defense. The first game, titled GemCraft Chapter One: The Forgotten (also known simply as "GemCraft"), is a tower defense flash game originally released on June 26, 2008. A prequel, GemCraft Chapter 0: Gem of Eternity, was released on April 16, 2009, and a disconnected chapter, GemCraft Lost Chapter: Labyrinth, was released February 17, 2011. On April 4, 2014 the sequel to the first game GemCraft Chapter Two: Chasing Shadows was released. The original game was released for iOS on April 14, 2011 by NTT Resonant. The next game, GemCraft Lost Chapter: Frostborn Wrath, was released in January 2020.

In GemCraft, players are given gems to combine and place into towers. Different combinations of gems produce different effects, such as splash damage, damage over time, and critical hit capability. The player's life bar and magic energy are represented by the same statistic—mana. With mana, the player can forge and combine gems and build towers, trenches, and traps. A key aspect of strategy in GemCraft is to increase the player's mana gain to high levels, enabling creation of stronger and stronger gems. Combining two gems creates a single more powerful gem, with the gem's power level indicated by its shape.

Plot
The series is set in a fantasy world. It depicts the battles of wizards against a powerful demon known as "The Forgotten". Wizards used to regularly summon demons to do their bidding until they brought forth a demon too powerful for them to control, who was also capable of subduing other demons under her command. Described as "a fully black female torso with disfigured arms, a head with long hair and no face", the Forgotten commands her legions in order to conquer the "Spiritforge", the last bastion of the wizards, in order to become omnipotent. There is no known way to destroy The Forgotten or to banish her back to the Demon Realm from which she was summoned. Instead, she can be sealed away by a powerful artifact known as a "Gem of Eternity", but it can only contain her for a few decades before she escapes, and each time she escapes, a new gem must be crafted in order to capture her again.

Reception

Gamezebo gave the original GemCraft game a rating of 3.5/5, stating: "While GemCraft isn't a revolutionary effort, it adds some new wrinkles into the usual 'build, defend, build' cycle in the genre re-popularized by Desktop Tower Defense."

References

External links
 
Peer's Take On GemCraft - Web Games Feature at IGN
The Joystiq Free Game Club: GemCraft - Joystiq

2008 video games
2009 video games
2011 video games
2014 video games
2015 video games
2019 video games
Browser games
Flash games
Single-player online games
Tower defense video games
IOS games
Video games developed in Hungary